The portraits of Vincent van Gogh (1853–1890) are the self-portraits, portraits of him by other artists, and photographs—one of which is dubious—of the Dutch artist. Van Gogh's dozens of self-portraits were an important part of his œuvre as a painter. Most probably, van Gogh's self-portraits are depicting the face as it appeared in the mirror he used to reproduce his face, i.e. his right side in the image is in reality the left side of his face.

Self-portraits

1885 
On July 14, 2022, an almost certainly authentic self-portrait of van Gogh was uncovered under his 1885 painting "Head of a peasant woman". Lesley Stevenson, a conservator at the Scottish National Gallery of Modern Art, discovered it during an X-ray examination of their existing pieces. It shows a bearded van Gogh in a brimmed hat and a neckerchief around his throat. His left ear was clearly visible. The portrait is covered under layers of cardboard and glue, which experts are searching for ways to remove in order to confirm its authenticity. They believe it was painted when van Gogh moved to France and learnt about the work of the impressionists there, an experience that influenced his more colourful and expressive style that is much admired today. The Dutch painter is known to often reuse his canvases or work on their reverse in order to save money. The X-ray image will be featured at a Royal Scottish Academy exhibit in Edinburgh and displayed using a specially made lightbox.

Paris 1886 
The first self-portrait by van Gogh that survived, is dated 1886.

Paris 1887

Arles

Saint-Rémy 
All the self-portraits executed in Saint-Rémy show the artist's head from the left, i.e. the side with non-mutilated ear.

Auvers-sur-Oise 
No self-portraits were executed by van Gogh in Auvers-sur-Oise, during the final weeks of his life.

Remarks 
 F208a: Self-Portrait with Dark Felt Hat is amongst the earliest of van Gogh's self-portraits. It was discovered late in the family collection and was not exhibited before 1945. Opinions differ about the date and place of its execution. De la Faille thought it painted in Antwerp before 1886, while Hulsker thought it painted in Paris in spring 1886. Hendriks and Tilborgh opt for autumn 1886, based on its resemblance to van Gogh's work that winter when he began to embrace Neo-impressionism. X-ray analysis reveals a nude figure study below. Since students did not work from nude models at Antwerp, this places the painting as executed in Paris where van Gogh had enrolled in Fernand Cormon's atelier. There is no other work in van Gogh's oeuvre which complements this portrait, which has led to some authors such as Dorn questioning its authenticity. However Hendriks and Tilborgh are satisfied that the painting is consistent with others executed at the beginning and end of van Gogh's first year in Paris. Marc Edo Tralbaut, van Gogh's principal biographer, especially valorised the portrait, selecting it for the dust-jacket of his biography and stating that van Gogh had "laid himself bare" for the portrait. Tralbaut notes that van Gogh painted a number of self-portraits at this time, possibly because of his difficulty in getting models to sit for him. He was in poor health and his teeth were falling out, prompting him to grow a moustache to conceal them. At this time he was wearing city-clothes in an effort to stress his middle-class background as he strove to establish a conventional career for himself as an artist.
F627: This painting may have been van Gogh's last self-portrait, which he gave to his brother.
F525: This painting may have been van Gogh's last self-portrait, which he gave to his mother as a birthday gift. Van Gogh painted Self-Portrait without beard just after he had shaved himself (Hulsker thought it painted in Arles following his admission to hospital after mutilating his ear when he was also shaved, as can be seen in the "bandaged ear" portraits F527 and F529). The painting can be seen in the third (smaller) version of Bedroom in Arles at the Musée d'Orsay. The self-portrait is one of the most expensive paintings of all time, selling for $71.5million in 1998 in New York. At the time, it was the third (or an inflation-adjusted fourth) most expensive painting ever sold.

Provenances 

F476: Vincent van Gogh, Arles, (1888) gift; to Paul Gauguin, (1888-1897) sold. [Ambroise Vollard, Paris.] [Paul Cassirer Gallery, Berlin.] Dr. Hugo von Tschudi, Berlin, (1906-1911), by descent; to his widow, Angela von Tschudi, Munich (1911-1919), to Neue Staatsgalerie, Munich, (1919-1939); removed from the collection by the National Socialist (Nazi) authorities in 1938,(EK16554) consigned; to [Galerie Fischer, Lucerne, Switzerland, sale: Gemälde und Plastiken Moderner Meister aus Deutschen Museen, 30 June 1939, no. 45]; to Maurice Wertheim (1939-1951) bequest; to Fogg Art Museum, 1951. Notes: Gauguin sold the painting for Fr 300, Hugo von Tschudi bought the painting for the Nationalgalerie, Berlin, with funds from sponsors, but did not submit it to the Kaiser for pre-approval. He took the painting to Munich when he assumed post there.

Scandals
In Nazi Germany, Vincent van Gogh's works were among those labelled generally "degenerate art". Several works were seized and sold/or destroyed by NS authorities including the self-portrait dedicated to Paul Gauguin, September 1888, which was seized from the Moderne Staatsgalerie in Munich to be sold at auction in 1939 in Lucerne, Switzerland, while other works by van Gogh could remain in this collection, but were kept under lock and key.

Fakes

Almost at the same time as when his Catalogue raisonné was published, Jacob Baart de la Faille had to admit that he had included paintings emerging from dubious sources, and of dubious quality. Shortly after, in 1930, De la Faille rejected some thirty odd paintings, which he had originally included in his catalogue - together with a hundred of others he had already excluded: Self-portraits - and Sunflowers - held a prominent place in the set he now rejected. In 1970, the editors of De la Faille's posthumous manuscript brand marked most of these dubious Self-portraits as forgeries, but could not settle all disputes, at least on one:

 The Selfportrait 'a l'éstampe japonais''', then in the collection of William Goetz, Los Angeles, was included, though all editors refused its authenticity.

Meanwhile, the authenticity of a second "self-portrait" has been challenged:

 The Selfportrait, 'à l'oreille mutilée', acquired in 1910 for the Nasjonalgalleriet, Oslo, had been unanimously rejected by scholars and technical researchers for decades, until provenance research by staff members reported pro domo the contrary.  On January 20, 2020 the results of research into this painting were published, and the conclusion was that this is a real Van Gogh painting, painted in the time that he was in a mental institution.
Note the painter shows his right ear, if painted via a mirror, while Van Gogh cut his left ear.

Portraits of Vincent van Gogh by other artists

Photographs

See also
List of works by Vincent van Gogh

Sources
Notes

References
 Dorn, Roland: Vincent, portraitiste: Bemerkungen zu ein paar heissen Eisen, in: Lukas Gloor, ed.: Van Gogh echt falsch: Zwei Selbstbildnisse der Sammlung Emil Bührle, Zürich 2005, pp. 7 – 21
 Hammacher, A. M.: Van Gogh: Selbstbildnisse, Philipp Reclam jun., Stuttgart 1960; 2nd edition 1970
 Hendriks, Ella; van Tilborgh, Louis. Vincent Van Gogh Paintings: 2, Lund Humphries 2011, 
 Van Lindert, Juleke, & Van Uitert, Evert: Een eigentijdse expressie: Vincent van Gogh en zijn portretten, Meulenhoff/Landshoff, Amsterdam 1990  
Pickvance, Ronald. Van Gogh In Saint-Rémy and Auvers (exh. cat. Metropolitan Museum of Art, New York:  Abrams, 1986. 
Tralbaut, Marc Edo. Vincent van Gogh'', London 1961, Macmillan,

External links
Van Gogh, paintings and drawings: a special loan exhibition, a fully digitized exhibition catalog from The Metropolitan Museum of Art Libraries, which contains material on these portraits (see index)
photograph supposedly of Van Gogh and Gauguin from 1887...

 
.van Gogh
Series of paintings by Vincent van Gogh
van Gogh
van Gogh
Paintings by Vincent van Gogh
Works by Vincent van Gogh